Arnsgereuth is a village and a former municipality in the district Saalfeld-Rudolstadt, in Thuringia, Germany. Since 1 December 2011, it is part of the town Saalfeld.

References

Former municipalities in Thuringia